USS Mindanao (ARG-3) was a Luzon-class internal combustion engine repair ship in service with the United States Navy from 1943 to 1947. She was sunk as an artificial reef in 1980.

History

Construction
Mindanao was named for the Island of Mindanao, second largest and southernmost island in the Philippines, it was the second U.S. Naval vessel to bear the name. She was laid down 11 April 1943, as the liberty ship SS Elbert Hubbard, under a Maritime Commission (MARCOM) contract, MCE hull 983, by the Bethlehem-Fairfield Shipyard, Inc., in Baltimore, Maryland; launched 13 May 1943; sponsored by Mrs. C. R. Spalding; acquired by the Navy on 20 May 1943; and commissioned as Mindanao on 6 November 1943.

Pacific War
After shakedown in Chesapeake Bay, Mindanao joined Task Group 29.7 (TG 29.7) on 20 December 1943, and sailed for Cuba, the Panama Canal, and Nouméa, New Caledonia, arriving 27 January 1944, to report for duty with Service Squadron South Pacific. The repair ship immediately found herself with more than enough work. On 25 February, she sailed to continue her vital task at Espiritu Santo, and in September she arrived at Manus to serve the forces staging for the Philippine campaign.

Mount Hood explosion

Now with TG 30.9, she was anchored in Seeadler Harbor on the morning of 10 November, when at about 08:50 the ammunition ship  blew up. Of her crew, 82 were killed and 98 wounded. The survivors, with Seabees from shore, immediately began to aid the wounded and clear the debris, a job which took seven days. By 21 December, Mindanao was ready to resume her key function in repairing engines for other ships.

After a brief voyage to the Solomon Islands in February and March 1945, Mindanao arrived at Ulithi 27 March, to prepare ships for the Okinawa campaign. There she served until 9 October, when she sailed for periods of duty at Okinawa and Shanghai.

Decommissioning and fate
Her duty supporting the occupation forces complete, Mindanao got underway for home 26 March 1946. She called at San Pedro, Los Angeles; Balboa and Colón, in the Panama Canal Zone; New Orleans, Louisiana; and Galveston, Texas, before arriving Orange, Texas, on 12 July. She decommissioned there 17 May 1947, to join the Atlantic Reserve Fleet, and remained at Orange, even after being struck from the Naval Vessel Register and transferred to the Maritime Commission (MARCOM) in 1961. On 9 May 1961, she joined the National Defense Reserve Fleet at Beaumont, Texas, where she remained until 19 April 1976, when she was withdrawn by the Navy to have her equipment removed. On 28 September 1976, Mindanao entered the James River NDRF, Lee Hall, Virginia, until she was finally withdrawn 12 March 1980, to become part of Florida's artificial reef program.

Notes

Bibliography

Online resources

External links

Luzon-class repair ships
Ships built in Baltimore
1943 ships
World War II auxiliary ships of the United States
Maritime incidents in November 1944
Shipwrecks of the Florida coast
Maritime incidents in 1980
Ships sunk as artificial reefs